Bena is a Bantu language spoken by the Bena people of the Iringa region of Tanzania.

Phonology

Consonants 

Voiceless sounds almost always occur as aspirated stops; [pʰ, tʰ, kʰ].

 /v/ can be realized as [ʋ] intervocalically.
 [ɖ] can occur as an allophone of /d/ before long non high vowels.
 [x] can occur as an allophone of /k/, /h/ in the Maswamu dialect.
 [cç, tʃ] can occur as allophones of /ts/, in the Twangabita dialect.
 [ⁿz] can occur as an allophone of /ⁿs/.
 [ɟ] can occur as an allophone of /j/ in the Maswamu dialect.
 [β, ʋ] can occur as allophones of /w/ among some speakers.
 Prenasalised stops may be devoiced when occurring word-finally (ex. /ᵐb/ ~ [ᵐb̥]).

Vowels 

 /i, u/ before non-rounded vowels are recognized as glides [j, w].

References

 

Languages of Tanzania
Northeast Bantu languages